Heulhae of Silla (r. 310–356, died 356), titled Heulhae Isageum, was the sixteenth ruler of the Korean kingdom of Silla.  He was a member of the aristocratic Seok clan, which held the throne for much of the early period of Silla.  According to the Samguk Sagi, he was the son of the general Uro, who was the son of Naehae Isageum.  Although we do not know his year of birth, he was young when he first came to the throne.

The Samguk Sagi also relates an alliance by marriage with Wa, which was concluded in 313 but broke down in 346.  In 347 there was a major invasion and the Japanese forces laid siege to Gyeongju.

Family
Grandfather: Naehae of Silla (died 230, r. 196–230)
Grandmother: Queen Seok, of the Seok Clan (석부인 석씨), daughter of Seok Goljeong (석골정)
Father:Seok Uru (석우로)
Mother: Daughter-in-law: Queen Myeongwon, of the Seok clan (명원부인 석씨), daughter of Jobun of Silla

See also
Three Kingdoms of Korea
Rulers of Korea
History of Korea

References
 Kim Bu-sik. Samguk Sagi, Part 2.

Silla rulers
356 deaths
4th-century monarchs in Asia
Year of birth unknown
4th-century Korean people